The Ministry of All the Talents was a national unity government in the United Kingdom formed by William Grenville, 1st Baron Grenville, on his appointment as Prime Minister on 11 February 1806, following the death of William Pitt the Younger.

History
With the country remaining at war, Grenville aimed to form the strongest possible government and so included most leading politicians from almost all groupings, although some followers of the younger Pitt, led by George Canning, refused to join.

The inclusion of Charles James Fox surprised some as King George III had previously been very hostile to Fox, but the King's willingness to put aside past enmities for the sake of national unity encouraged many others to join or support the government as well. The ministry boasted a fairly progressive agenda, much of it inherited from Pitt.

The Ministry of All the Talents had comparatively little success, failing to bring the sought-after peace with France. In fact, the war continued for nearly another decade. It did, however, abolish the slave trade in Britain in 1807 before breaking up in 1807 over the question of Catholic emancipation.

It was succeeded by the Second Portland ministry, headed by William Cavendish-Bentinck, 3rd Duke of Portland.

List of ministers 
Members of the Cabinet are in bold face.

Notes

Other uses of the term
The term has since been used in politics to describe an administration with members from more than one party or even a non-coalition government that enjoys cross-party support due to gifted and/or non-partisan members. Examples include the coalition government which led Great Britain through the Second World War and the Canadian government that won the 1896 election. In the Republic of Ireland, the Government of the 20th Dáil (a Fine Gael–Labour coalition that was in office between 1973 and 1977) was widely called the "cabinet of all the talents."

References

All the Talents
1806 establishments in the United Kingdom
1807 disestablishments in the United Kingdom
1800s in the United Kingdom
All the Talents
All the Talents
All the Talents
All the Talents
All the Talents